Maspeth station was a stop along the original New York & Flushing Railroad that opened on January 15, 1855. Maspeth station was located at Covert Avenue, now 58th Street, at Joy Street, now 54th Drive. So far as is known, there was no depot building. This station was discontinued very early on, probably in 1858. The segment between what was to become the former Laurel Hill station and Winfield station, was abandoned for passenger service in 1875, including the location of the Maspeth station, and completely abandoned in 1880. Part of the right-of-way ran through what is today the Mount Zion Jewish Cemetery in Maspeth. The Flushing and Woodside was merged into the Flushing and North Side in 1871, and its line was abandoned in favor of the ex-New York and Flushing line.

References

External links
Flushing Railroad & Penny Bridge Station (Arrt's Arrchives)

Former Long Island Rail Road stations in New York City
Railway stations in Queens, New York
Railway stations in the United States opened in 1855
Railway stations closed in 1858